MIX NYC is a not-for-profit organization based in New York City and dedicated to queer experimental film. It is also known as the "MIX festival," for its most visible program, the annual New York Lesbian and Gay Experimental Film Festival (NYLGEFF), which has featured early works by filmmakers such as Christine Vachon, Todd Haynes, Isaac Julien, Thomas Allen Harris, Barbara Hammer, Jonathan Caouette, Jennie Livingston, and Matthew Mishory.

History

1980s
MIX was founded in 1987 by Sarah Schulman and Jim Hubbard. The festival was created because newly emerging Gay Film Festivals were not including formally inventive work, and the then vibrant experimental film venues marginalized gay and lesbian work. They were aided by curators Jack Waters and Peter Cramer from Naked Eye Cinema and Ela Troyano who programmed The New York Film Festival Downtown. The first festival featured the world premiere of Su Freidrich's Damned If You Don't, and from then on the festival became a showcase for new works by established makers, archival masters like Barbara Rubin's Christmas on Earth, and new emerging artists. Quickly, in  concert with the emerging AIDS Activist and Queer Activist movement of the day- The New York Lesbian & Gay Experimental Film Festival (NYLGEFF) became a mass cultural event in the LGBT underground. Friday nights were guaranteed sold-out "Lesbian Date Nights" and a counter-culture of new interest in filmmaking and video production emerged around the festival community. MIX soon became very influential on other programming venues, often contributing significant work to The Whitney Biennial, Berlin International Film Festival and other important screens. MIX  exhibited first films by major lesbian, gay and bisexual filmmakers including Todd Haynes' college thesis film, Assassins: A Film Concerning Rimbaud, (which got him his first review, ever), Maria Maggenti's Name Day, the first screening of Paris Is Burning, when it was still on a dual system, Christine Vachon's first film, and many others. Hubbard and Schulman prioritized artists' fees, paying all makers equally regardless of the length of their work, since in experimental film, labor intensivity was not determined by length. They included the first focus on films by and about black gay men in any film Festival. Schulman and Hubbard worked long and hard to get press review coverage for gay experimental work, often holding individual press screenings at the critic's convenience. They hand wheatpasted posters on buildings around the city, and leafleted areas where gay people hung out, like the piers and bars. MIX received no funding and managed to break even on enthusiastic box office support. They showed gay experimental film from other countries and brought films by hand to venues around the US, Europe and Japan. The festival has shown the work of filmmakers such as Barbara Hammer, Nisha Ganatra, Teri Rice, Jonathan Caouette, and Isaac Julien among hundreds more. As makers began to die of AIDS, Jim became active in film preservation, beginning with the film Avocada by the late Bill Vehr of the Ridiculous Theatrical Company. Eventually, he preserved over 2,000 hours of AIDS Film and Video, now available for free viewing at the New York Public Library. During Sarah and Jim's tenure, no one was ever turned away from MIX due to inability to pay. The festival also included Transsexual work from the very first year, with Marguerite Paris's film All Women Are Equal. They found ways of getting works by makers like Chantal Ackerman who did not show in gay festivals. Among many fabulous moments in the festival's history was MIX's screening of Andy Warhol's Blow Job which was attended by Kitty Carlisle Hart in a gown with a tuxedo'd escort.

1990s
Hubbard & Schulman ran the festival together as a community event from 1987-1991. After the 1991 festival, Schulman wanted to devote more time to her writing.  The 1992 festival was organized by Hubbard and filmmakers Marguerite Paris and Jerry Tartaglia. That year also introduced shows programmed by guest curators, who brought new perspectives to the line-up. Notable shows included Our Fanzine Friends, which drew upon the hot trend of queer zines, featuring work by Glenn Belverio and Bruce LaBruce; and Fire, featuring work from the African diaspora. This last program featured work by Dawn Suggs, Shari Frilot, Thomas Allen Harris and others.

In 1993 Frilot and Karim Ainouz were the co-directors, and introduced many changes, including the name MIX, the production of a catalog (instead of handing our program notes), a new venue (The Kitchen instead of Anthology Film Archives) and a commitment to multicultural presentations and installation work. A stunning program that year was called The 1000 Dreams of Desire, curated by Jim Lyons. It was a special show featuring Teri Rice's The Kindling Point and Les Affaires, at the Ann Street Bookstore in Lower Manhattan, where the peep booths were reprogrammed with experimental video, and 16mm film was projected in a separate room. MIX returned to Anthology in 1994, and combined with DCTV's Lookout Lesbian & Gay Video Festival because DCTV's building was under renovation. Ainouz scaled back his involvement, and Frilot became the definitive voice of MIX, making the organization a home for emerging filmmakers and makers of color. This was signaled by 1994's opening feature, Brincando El Charco, and even more powerfully when 1995's opening and closing events were films by makers of color These films, Vintage: Families of Value by Thomas Allen Harris, and Frilot's own documentary Black Nations/Queer Nations, brought new audiences to MIX. They started satellite festivals such as MIX Brasil (1993) and MIX Mexico (1996).

1996 was the festival's 10th anniversary, and in honor of this milestone MIX presented queer work from the African diaspora at the Victoria Theater in Harlem, in addition to its downtown programs at NYU's Cantor Film Center and the Knitting Factory.

Frilot headed MIX through 1996. Her other legacy was a commitment to installation work and the nascent digital realm. Installations were on view in 1993, on the upper floor of the Kitchen. But in 1994, Shu Lea Cheang and Beth Stryker curated Cyberqueer, in the basement galleries of Anthology. Although installations were presented in subsequent years, they never matched these early efforts until new MIX NYC staff began devoting substantial space and resources to installations in 2006. Frilot went on to become a curator at the Sundance Film Festival.

Rajendra Roy was in charge in 1997, when the festival moved to Cinema Village, which was then a single-screen theater on E. 12th Street. In 1997 Ernesto Foronda and Maïa Cybelle Carpenter were programming coordinators for the festival. Carpenter stayed on until 1999, also curating additional programs in the years to follow. Roy brought on Anie Stanley as artistic director in 1998, and as a team they propelled MIX to greater visibility, with more corporate sponsorship, but with less emphasis on the identity politics of the early 1990s. 1998 also saw a sidebar of 8 mm films curated by Stephen Kent Jusick, featuring work by both contemporary makers and old masters, such as Jack Smith, and Andy Warhol's Polavision home movies. Roy is now the Celeste Bartos Chief Curator of Film at The Museum of Modern Art.

2000s
Roy & Stanley stepped down after the 2000 festival, making way for Ioannis Mookas, who took the title of Executive Director. The organization, whose offices had been in the financial district, suffered after 9/11, and Mookas left after overseeing two festivals.

MIX NYC as an organization took a new direction in 2003, when it initiated the ACT UP Oral History Project, run by Hubbard and Schulman (www.actuporalhistory.org), and funded by a grant from the Ford Foundation. This new effort gave the organization another aspect, different from being just a film festival.

Larry Shea and Stephen Winter took the helm of the festival in 2003. Jonathan Caouette's Tarnation was shepherded into being under Winter's supervision, and its premiere as the festival centerpiece was the beginning of its illustrious path to Cannes, the New York Film Festival and a distribution deal with Wellspring in 2004. Shea and Winter also reimagined the 1000 Dreams of Desire program from 1993, re-staging it, with differences, at the same Ann Street location as the original. This time, in addition to the video booths and screening room on the upper floors, the basement was also cleared out, and set up with DJs, ambient 16mm & 8mm film projections, and a dance floor.

A large-scale installation called Cake, about garment workers, by Mary Ellen Strom & Ann Carlson, debuted at South Street Seaport as the festival centerpiece.  MIX expanded beyond the concept of the annual festival more in late 2004, with the introduction of MIXtv, which aired weekly on Manhattan Neighborhood Network.

Yet MIX was unable to capitalize on the success of Tarnation, and financial troubles led Shea to move the festival from November to April 2005, skipping 2004 entirely. The opening night "happening" was held at the Gershwin Hotel, while regular screenings were at Anthology Film Archives. Jim Morrison created silk-screened T-shirts for the festival, the first time MIX had shirts since 1996. MIX began a community screening program, which took work to various neighborhoods and communities, beginning with the Bronx in February 2005.

Larry Shea left MIX after the 2005 festival to devote more time to his video art, and a new team was appointed in the fall, including Andre Hereford, Szu Burgess, Kate Huh and Stephen Kent Jusick. Moving MIX back to its traditional November timeslot was the first decision of the new staff.

In May 2006, MIX began the Naked Eye Celebrity Camera benefit, auctioning off disposable cameras exposed by artists and celebrities including Laurie Anderson, Gus Van Sant, B.D. Wong, Alec Soth and over 100 others. The 2006 festival, the 19th, was held at the new 3LD Art & Technology Center in Lower Manhattan, and featured two screening rooms as well as window installations and an installations lounge.

The 2007 festival began with a name change, to the New York Queer Experimental Film Festival, after a few years of requests from the public to a name more inclusive  than "Lesbian and Gay" and embracing of contemporary terminology. The festival was held in an empty storefront in SoHo, and marked a shift away from traditional theater venues.  Installations covered the space, and led back to the makeshift screening room. Additional installations were in the mezzanine, overlooking the whole space. Many shows were packed, including the Butt magazine show, and Homoccult and other Esoterotica, guest curated by Daniel McKernan and Richie Rennt.  Another highlight was a screening of a rare 16mm print shot by Women's Liberation Cinema (Kate Millett and Susan Kleckner, among others) of the 1971 gay pride march in New York. For this screening Sharon Hayes performed a live audio accompaniment. Hayes continued working with this material, and the film and recorded audio were included in Hayes's show at the Whitney Museum in 2012.

In 2008 MIX took over a former Liz Claiborne department store in the South Street Seaport, filling every nook and cranny with installations, decorations and performances. The festival took place in October, earlier than its traditional mid-November dates, because the space, donated free of charge by the landlord, was only available at that time. This year MIX NYC initiated a program of artist-designed T-shirts celebrating the festival, each available in a limited edition.

The 2009 festival took place in Chelsea for the first time since 1993, this time in an  empty storefront of a newly constructed condo building. Ceiling to floor glass windows gave MIX unprecedented street visibility, including projections by Lori Hiris and Kadet Kuhne. Installations were prominent again, most notably a large geodesic dome that was Wildflowers of Manitoba, by Luis Jacob and Noam Gonick. A live actor inhabited the dome, silently lying there, listening to records, lighting incense and ruminating,  while 3 projections illuminated some of the panels with scenes of a same-sex love and commitment. The closing night feature Maggots & Men, by Carey Cronenwett, was sold out, as were several other shows. The festival suffered some noise complaints from condo residents above, who felt that festival-goers were too loud.

The 2010 festival was held at Theater for the New City, back in the East Village. Using three theater spaces in the TNC complex, MIX emphasized an immersive environment with a string art design in the venue by Diego Montoya. One smaller theater contained a performative installation by Daniel Pillis. Another theater was turned into an installation lounge, anchored by Blaise Garber-Paul's Queer Fruit Tree, which grew and changed throughout the week, and under which visitors could sit on astroturf, or on conical black cushions. The closing night film was Bruce LaBruce's L.A. Zombie, which sold out, and a second screening was added.

In 2011 MIX took over a disused theater on Bleecker Street. The festival trailer, made on 16mm film by Gina Carducci, was projected on a continuous loop onto the building across the street, above the subway entrance. The venue design told a story of sorts. The lobby was dark with back-lit curtains that gave the impression of being in outer space. From there visitors could enter the screening room, or venture through  lush psychedelic forest, and down steps to a subterranean space cave made of pink paper mache and pointy pink pillows. This downstairs space was a lounge, had a second stage used for performances, and contained most of the installations, including work by Adriana Varella, Szu Burgess, Coco Rico and others. The Occupy Wall Street movement was going on at the same time, and the NYPD raided Zuccotti Park just before the festival opened. As a result, MIX made the decision to open the venue as a sanctuary for queer Occupiers.

The 25th MIX Festival took place in a two-story 20,000 sf former nut roasting factory in the Gowanus section of Brooklyn, the first time the festival had been held outside Manhattan. The first floor was a wide-open space that contained all of the many installations, as well as a small performance stage and many lounging areas. An interior design of spandex "explosions" filled the space, often running from ceiling to floor. The second floor, accessible only by a steep staircase, held the screening room, as well as 2 restrooms and administrative space. The closing night film was She Said Boom, about the Toronto band Fifth Column, with band member Caroline Azar in attendance.

After the success of the festival in Brooklyn, the festival returned to Gowanus in 2013, taking over a 25,000 ft warehouse, which gave over about 15,000 sf to installation work, and 3600 sf screening room. The festival's visual theme was body parts, and a giant inflatable lung, which breathed slightly, greeted festival-goers as they entered. There were other inflatables, including Rachel Shannon's Breastival Vestibules, and other plastics that resembled veins. Jonathan Caouette returned to the festival with a new film that he finished hours before the screening at MIX NYC.

See also 
 LGBT culture in New York City

External links 
 NYU's Fales Library Guide to the MIX Collection
 MIX NYC

Cultural festivals in the United States
Film festivals established in 1987
LGBT events in New York (state)
Experimental film festivals
Queer organizations
Film festivals in New York City
LGBT film festivals in the United States